Musimbi Kanyoro (born 30 November 1953) is a Kenyan human rights advocate who served as the CEO and President of the Global Fund for Women from 2011 until 2019, and currently serves as Chair of the International Board of the United World Colleges. She is a founding member of the Circle of Concerned African Women Theologians, and was elected as the first coordinator of the Circle of Concerned African Women Theologians at the continental gathering in 1996, a post she held until 2002.

Musimbi Kanyoro also serves with former President of Ireland Mary Robinson on several projects, including the Board of Directors of Realizing Rights: the Ethical Globalization Initiative.

Early life and education
Kanyoro was born in Migori County, Kenya. Born in a rural area, Kanyoro moved into suburban Nairobi where she attended the Alliance girls school.  She attributes being in a girls-only space as having a powerful way of building and shaping confidence in her early life.

Growing up in the 1970s, her focus along with the African Continent was the liberation of South Africa. "She was a student when she joined the movement against apartheid which led her to fight for women and girls".

She earned an undergraduate degree from the University of Nairobi and a PhD in linguistics from the University of Texas at Austin.  Kanyoro later earned a doctorate in feminist theology at the San Francisco Theological Seminary, and has received three honorary doctorate degrees. She was also a visiting scholar of Hebrew and the Old Testament at Harvard.

Career

From 1982 to 1997, Kanyoro served in the Lutheran World Federation as its executive secretary for Women in Church and Society. She was the Executive Secretary for the Desk for Women in Church and Society for the Lutheran World Federation, joining them in 1987. Kanyoro also edited the book In Search of a Round Table: Gender, Theology and Church Leadership, in 1998. She also worked as a translation consultant for the United Bible Societies.  From 1998 to 2007 Kanyoro became the first woman from the continent of Africa to serve as the YWCA's World Secretary General.

Kanyoro was director of the Population and Reproductive Health Program of the David and Lucile Packard Foundation from 2007 to 2011. From 2018 until 2019, she served on an Independent Commission on Sexual Misconduct, Accountability and Culture Change at Oxfam, co-chaired by Zainab Bangura and Katherine Sierra. Dr. Musimbi Kanyoro was president and CEO of Global Fund for Women from 2011 to 2019.

Other activities
 Family Planning 2020 (FP2020), Member of the Reference Group
 UNFPA/IPPF High-Level task force for Reproductive Health 2015, Member
 Global Philanthropy Committee of the Council of Foundations, Member
 Aspen Institute Council for Women Leaders for Reproductive Health, Member 
 Mary Robinson Foundation – Climate Justice, Member of the International Advisory Council
 United World Colleges, Chair of the UWC International Board

Kanyoro served as a Member of the Board of Directors of the African Population and Health Research Centre, and was for seven years the chair of the board of ISIS Work. She also serves on the boards of CARE, Intra Health, CHANGE and Legacy Memory Bank, and is a member of the World Health Organization.

Recognition
1999 – Human Rights Award
1999 – Doctor of Divinity (honorary), Trinity Lutheran Seminary, (TLS) USA, for significant contribution to Christian Theology
2000 – The Wittenberg Award
2005 – designated a State Commendations of Kenya|Moran of the Order of the Burning Spear (MBS).
2005 – Women of Substance Award
2005 – Global Leadership Award, World Vision and International AIDS Trust, USA 
2005 – Nominee, 1000 Women for the Nobel Peace Prize,
2006 – Women, Leadership and Human Dignity Award
2008 – Inaugural Lecturer: Nelson Mandela Lecture Series
2011 – Changing the Face of Philanthropy
2012 – National Council for Research on Women 2012

Works
Dube, Musa and Musimbi R.A. Kanyoro, eds.  Grant me justice!: HIV/AIDS & gender readings of the Bible. Cluster Publications, 2004. 
Kanyoro, Musimbi R.A. and Nyambura J. Njoroge, eds. Groaning in Faith: African women in the household of God. Nairobi: Acton Publishers. Papers From the Interfaith Circle of Concerned African Women Theologians, 1996. 
Kanyoro, Musimbi R.A., ed. In search of a round table: gender, theology & church leadership. Geneva: WCC Publications, 1997. 
Kanyoro, Musimbi R.A. and Nyambura J. Njoroge, eds.  A decade of solidarity with the Bible : decade festival : visions beyond 1998.  Geneva: WCC Publications, 1998.
Kanyoro, Musimbi R.A., Introducing Feminist Cultural Hermeneutics: An African Perspective. Cleveland: Pilgrim Press, 2002. 
Kanyoro, Musimbi R.A., Forward to The alternative Luther : Lutheran theology from the subaltern, edited by Else Marie Wiberg Pedersen. Minneapolis: Fortress Academic, 2019.
Oduyoye, Mercy Amba and Musimbi R.A. Kanyoro, eds.  The Will to Arise: Women, Tradition, and the Church in Africa. Maryknoll, NY: Orbis Books, 2005. .

References

External links
Global Fund for Women
Legacy Memory Bank Advisory Board

Kenyan activists
Kenyan women activists
1953 births
Living people
Harvard Divinity School faculty
Kenyan Lutherans
Morans of the Order of the Burning Spear
Kenyan academics
People from Migori County